Functionalism may refer to:

 Functionalism (architecture), the principle that architects should design a building based on the purpose of that building
 Functionalism in international relations, a theory that arose during the inter-War period
 Functional linguistics, a theoretical approach to the study of language
 Functionalism (philosophy of mind), a theory of the mind in contemporary philosophy
 Functionalism versus intentionalism, a historiographical debate about the origins of the Holocaust
 Structural functionalism, a theoretical tradition within sociology and anthropology
 Biological functionalism, an anthropological paradigm

See also 
 Danish functional linguistics
 Functional (disambiguation)
 Functional psychology
 Neofunctionalism